"Transfigurations" is the 25th episode of the third season of the American science fiction television series Star Trek: The Next Generation, and the 73rd episode of the series overall.

Set in the 24th century, the series follows the adventures of the Starfleet crew of the Federation starship Enterprise-D. In this episode, the Enterprise rescues a critically injured amnesiac who is undergoing a mysterious transformation.

Plot
The Enterprise discovers a crashed escape pod in an unexplored star system. Investigating, they find there is one critically injured passenger in the pod, and the crew brings him aboard the ship. Dr. Crusher determines the survivor will live due to the stranger's own amazing recuperative powers. Crusher also notes that the survivor's cells are mutating in some way.

A couple of days later the stranger finally awakens, but has no memory of his life or identity. The crew decides to call him "John Doe". Some time passes and John has recovered physically, but still has amnesia. In addition, from time to time he suffers from severe pain which is somehow tied to his ongoing mutation. He also begins emitting strange, bright energy bursts. John soon learns that he is able to use this energy to heal injuries, as witnessed by Crusher when he aids an injured O'Brien in her Sickbay.

In the meantime, Geordi La Forge has determined the pod the Enterprise discovered was a kind of storage device. Geordi is also able to interpret a star chart and find the location of John's home planet. However, John's memory has begun to return, and he senses that he must not go back to his home planet yet. A day or so later, a vessel intercepts the Enterprise, and John declares he has to leave. He tries to steal a shuttle and an energy burst accidentally knocks Lieutenant Worf from a walkway, resulting in a fatal fall to the floor below due to a broken neck. John then uses his healing powers to revive Worf and heal his injuries. Prevented from escaping, John explains that he wanted to leave as he is becoming a danger to himself and the crew.

Captain Sunad of the intercepting ship communicates with the Enterprise, announcing he is from the planet Zalkon and that he wants John returned to him. He explains that John is a criminal who has been given a death sentence. Captain Picard considers the situation, but refuses to release John to the Zalkonians without more information as to the charges. He contacts the other ship and mentions John's strange powers, which alarms Captain Sunad. Sunad immediately triggers a device which causes the entire Enterprise crew to become unable to breathe. John resists the device and heals everyone aboard the Enterprise with one bright flash of his energy.

His memory now restored, John transports Sunad to the Enterprise using his powers. John explains that his race has reached a new stage in evolution, in which they are evolving into beings of energy. His homeworld's government fears what is happening and, telling the population it is a deadly sickness, kills any who show the signs of change; John and others aboard the ship were escaping from their homeworld when attacked. John then becomes the first to complete the transformation, becoming invulnerable.

John offers to help Sunad make this transformation as well, but Sunad still refuses. John sends Sunad back to his own ship, warning him that their government can no longer keep their people in ignorance. The Zalkonian ship then leaves the area. John bids the crew good-bye, transforms into energy and departs the ship. While it's not known where John went, the implication is that John left for his homeworld so that other Zalkonians would have the chance to evolve and join him.

Notes
"Transfigurations" was one of a long line of Star Trek episodes dealing with the effects of accelerated humanoid evolution. In several science fiction realms, including Star Trek, Doctor Who, Stargate SG-1, and Babylon 5, the highest evolutionary form is suggested to be an intelligence no longer bound by physical form, but instead constituted as pure energy. In several of these contexts, the highly evolved beings are gifted with extraordinary healing powers. This concept was first explored in the TOS episode "Charlie X", but it was given more rhetorical force in "Errand of Mercy".

Reception
Keith R. A. DeCandido of Tor.com gave the episode 7 out of 10.

Releases
On October 3, 1995 "Best of Both Worlds, Part I" and "Transfigurations" were released on LaserDisc in the United States.

The episode was released with Star Trek: The Next Generation season three DVD box set, released in the United States on July 2, 2002. This had 26 episodes of Season 3 on seven discs, with a Dolby Digital 5.1 audio track. It was released in high-definition Blu-ray in the United States on April 30, 2013.

References

 Star Trek The Next Generation DVD set, volume 3, disc 7, selection 1.

External links

 

Star Trek: The Next Generation (season 3) episodes
1990 American television episodes